Dennis Chessa (born 19 October 1992) is a German professional footballer who plays as a midfielder for SSV Ulm.

Career

Bayern Munich
Chessa joined the Bayern Munich Junior Team from SSV Ulm 1846 in 2008, and made his debut for their reserve team in April 2010, as a substitute for Christoph Knasmüllner in a 3. Liga match against Borussia Dortmund II. He was not involved with Bayern II during the 2010–11 season, which saw the club relegated from the 3. Liga, but returned to the team the following year. In 2013–14 he was a regular in the Bayern II team that won the Regionalliga Bayern title, but missed promotion after a defeat against Fortuna Köln in the playoffs.

VfR Aalen
In July 2014, Chessa signed for 2. Bundesliga side VfR Aalen. In September 2014 he made his debut in a 2. Bundesliga match against Greuther Fürth, as a substitute for Michael Klauß.

SV Ried
For the 2016–17 season, Chessa signed for Austrian Football Bundesliga side SV Ried.

Career statistics

References

External links
 
 

1992 births
Living people
German footballers
Association football midfielders
Germany youth international footballers
FC Bayern Munich II players
VfR Aalen players
SV Ried players
KFC Uerdingen 05 players
FK Pirmasens players
TSV Steinbach Haiger players
SSV Ulm 1846 players
Austrian Football Bundesliga players
2. Bundesliga players
3. Liga players
Regionalliga players
German expatriate footballers
German expatriate sportspeople in Austria
Expatriate footballers in Austria